This list is of the Cultural Properties of Japan designated in the category of  for the Prefecture of Tokushima.

National Cultural Properties
As of 1 January 2015, three Important Cultural Properties have been designated, being of national significance.

Prefectural Cultural Properties
As of 19 December 2014, seventeen properties have been designated at a prefectural level.

See also
 Cultural Properties of Japan
 List of National Treasures of Japan (archaeological materials)
 List of Historic Sites of Japan (Tokushima)
 List of Cultural Properties of Japan - historical materials (Tokushima)

References

External links
  List of Cultural Properties in Tokushima Prefecture

Archaeological materials,Tokushima
Tokushima,Cultural Properties
Culture in Tokushima Prefecture
History of Tokushima Prefecture